HTMS Naresuan (FFG-421), commissioned in 1995, is a modified version of the Chinese-made Type 053 frigate, corporate designed between Royal Thai Navy and China but built by the China State Shipbuilding Corporation in Shanghai. Her sister ship,  was delivered in November 1995. The ships came at 2 billion baht each, less than the 8 billion baht claimed price tag for Western-built frigates.

The Royal Thai Navy complained of the poor quality of the ships. The ship's damage control system was very limited, with very basic fire suppression systems. It was claimed that if the ship's hull was breached, the ship would be quickly lost to flooding. The Thai Navy had to spend considerable time and effort to correct some of these issues.

Upgrade
On 3 June 2011, Saab announced that it was awarded a contract for the upgrading of the two Naresuan-class frigates. The scope of the upgrade included Saab's 9LV MK4 combat management system, Sea Giraffe AMB, CEROS 200 fire control radar, EOS 500 electro-optics system and data link systems for communications with the newly acquired Royal Thai Air Force Erieye surveillance aircraft.

On 8 August 2012, DSCA announced Thailand's intention to acquire the Evolved Sea Sparrow (ESSM) missile and associated equipment to upgrade the frigates and a Letter of Offer and Acceptance was signed with Raytheon on 14 January 2013.

Service history
On 30 August 2015, the ESSM was fired from Naresuan during Exercise CARAT 2015.

References 

Ships built in China
Naresuan-class frigates
1993 ships